John Austin may refer to:

Arts and entertainment
John P. Austin (1906–1997), American set decorator
Johnny Austin (1910–1983), American musician
John Austin (author) (fl. 1940s), British novelist

Military 
John Austin (soldier) (1801–1833), active in early settlement of Mexican Texas
John Arnold Austin (1905–1941), United States Navy warrant officer
John Beech Austin (1917–2012), British aviator in World War II

Politics 
John Gardiner Austin (1812–1900), British colonial secretary of Hong Kong
Sir John Austin, 1st Baronet (1824–1906), British politician, MP for Osgoldcross
John Austin (politician) (born 1944), British politician, MP

Religion
John Austin (1613–1669), English Catholic theologian and writer
John Austin (Jesuit) (1717–1784), Irish Jesuit
John Mather Austin (1805–1880), American Universalist clergyman
John Austin (bishop) (1939–2007), British bishop of Aston

Sports
John Austin (cricketer) (1871–1956), Barbadian cricketer
John Austin (basketball) (born 1944), American basketball player
John Austin (tennis) (born 1957), American tennis player
John Austin (American football) (fl. 1976–2003), American college football player and coach

Others 
J. L. Austin (John Langshaw Austin, 1911–1960), British philosopher of language
J. Paul Austin. President and CEO of The Coca-Cola Company, 1962–1981
John Austin (highwayman) (died 1783), English criminal, last person hanged on the gallows at Tyburn, London
John Austin (inventor) (1752–1830), Scottish inventor of musical equipment
John Austin (legal philosopher) (1790–1859), British legal and political theorist
John Alexander Austin (1912–1984), Canadian aviator
John C. Austin (1870–1963), British-born American architect
John Osborne Austin (1849–1918), American genealogist

See also
John Austen (disambiguation)
Jack Austin (disambiguation)